The path of the flaming sword (Hebrew: נתיב החרב הבוערת) is a concept in Kabbalah which represents the order which the 10 sefirot were created in. 

The path emanates from the Ein Sof, the boundless source of divinity. It begins at Keter (crown) and ends at Malkuth (realm) where the physical world manifests. 

The order of creation is as follows: 

 Keter (Crown)
 Chokmah (Wisdom)
 Binah (Understanding)
 Da’at (Knowledge)
 Chesed (Love)
 Gevurah (Strength)
 Tiferet (Beauty)
 Netzach (Victory)
 Hod (Compassion)
 Yesod (Foundation)
 Malkuth (Realm)

Name 

The name comes from the flaming sword which God put to guard the Garden of Eden after Adam and Eve were cast out.

Gematric Significance 

Some have noted that the path resembles three 7s. This may correspond to the value of the Hebrew letters of the tree of life connectivity that the path overlaps with which, in gematria (Jewish numerology) have a value of 777 when added together.

See also 

 Flaming Sword (mythology)
 Four Worlds
 Sefirot
 Tree of Life (Kabbalah)

References 

Kabbalah